Otitoma porcellana is a species of sea snail, a marine gastropod mollusc in the family Pseudomelatomidae, the turrids and allies.

Description
The length of the shell varies between 13 mm and 15 mm.

Distribution
This marine species occurs off Mactan Island, Philippines

References

 Stahlschmidt P., Poppe G.T. & Tagaro S.P. (2018). Descriptions of remarkable new turrid species from the Philippines. Visaya. 5(1): 5-64 page(s): 27, pl. 21 figs 1-2.

External links
 Gastropods.com: Otitoma porcellana

porcellana
Gastropods described in 2018